Soft Boiled is a 1923 American silent comedy Western film written and directed by John G. Blystone. The film stars Tom Mix, Billie Dove, Joseph W. Girard, Lee Shumway, Tom Wilson, and Frank Beal. The film was released on August 26, 1923, by Fox Film Corporation.

Plot 
Tom Steele (Tom Mix) and his uncle John Steele (Frank Beal) both suffer from a short temper.  Tom has worked to control his temper.  John tests him to see if he has been successful by betting Tom he can't go a month without losing his temper.

Tom is successful, but after words destroys everything in sight because of the insults to his sweetheart (Billie Dove) during the bet.

Cast         
 Tom Mix as Tom Steele
 Billie Dove as The Girl
 Joseph W. Girard as The Ranch Owner
 Lee Shumway as The Road House Manager 
 Tom Wilson as The Butler
 Frank Beal as John Steele
 Jack Curtis as The Ranch Foreman
 Charles Hill Mailes as The Lawyer
 Harry Dunkinson as The Storekeeper
 Clarence Wilson as The Reformer 
 Tony the Horse as Tony

References

External links

 
 

1923 films
1920s Western (genre) comedy films
Fox Film films
Films directed by John G. Blystone
American black-and-white films
1923 comedy films
Silent American Western (genre) comedy films
1920s English-language films
1920s American films